Micro Scooters Limited is an importer and retailer of a range of children’s & adult scooters, based in London. The company was founded in 2004 by marine lawyer Anna Gibson and charity fundraiser Philippa Gogarty, .

History 

After Anna’s son borrowed another child’s three wheel scooter at an event on Clapham Common and refused to give it back, Anna and Philippa made contact with Swiss banker Wim Oubtoer, the founder of Micro Mobility Systems and the manufacturers of the scooter Anna's son had borrowed. The two parties came to an agreement which allowed Gibson and Gogarty the licensing rights to sell Micro Scooters in the UK. After selling Mini Micro scooters to their friends at the school gates success came quickly, with word of mouth providing the best marketing tool. A buyer from John Lewis subsequently picked up on the success Gibson and Gogarty were experiencing and within a year of starting to sell them at the school gates, Micro Scooters became John Lewis’ bestselling toy selling 65,000 scooters at the Christmas of 2009.

In 2010 the company sold over 120,000 scooters with turnover of £4.3m.

Awards

After the initial success of the 'Mini Micro' scooter, Gibson & Gogarty worked directly with Micro Mobility Systems to produce scooter variants for younger and older children. Micro Scooters Limited now retail over 50 models of scooter suitable for ages 12 months up to adult. This has resulted in industry recognition via a number of reputable publications and newspapers.

2018

 Micro Cruiser scooter – Voted best designed scooter by Junior Design magazine 

2019

 3in1 Mini Micro scooter – Voted best scooter for toddlers by Cycling World
 Mini Micro scooter – Voted best scooter for kids by The Telegraph
 Maxi Micro scooter – Voted best scooter for kids by The Independent
 Micro Sprite scooter – Voted best 2 wheeled scooter by DadsNet readers 
 Micro electric scooter – Voted best electric scooter by AutoExpress

According to Sustrans, 2.4% of school children in Scotland used a scooter to get to school in 2018.

Big Pedal 
Micro Scooters UK currently sponsors the Big Pedal - the UKs largest event that encourages school pupils, teachers and parents to scoot, cycle or walk to school for two consecutive weeks. In 2019 the Big Pedal event attracted over 550,000 participants.

To encourage more children to scoot to school Micro Scooters sponsors and runs Scoot Safe classes around the country via the Team Rubicon training company.

Car Free Day 
Since 2015 Micro Scooters UK have taken part in Car Free Day. The scooters have been gifted to consumers on their way to work or to families to use to 'scoot the school run' rather than drive.

Scootercise 
In 2016 the company launched Scootercise, a new method of exercise based around using a scooter, in association with personal trainer Mari-Anne Elder.

See also 

 Micro Mobility Systems
 Kick scooters

References

External links 

 Official website
 Micro Scooters on Twitter

Companies based in London
2003 establishments in the United Kingdom
Kick scooters